Hugh Murray may refer to:

 Hugh Murray (footballer) (born 1979), Scottish professional footballer
 Hugh Murray (geographer) (1779–1846), Scottish geographer
 Hugh Murray (judge) (1825–1857), third Chief Justice of the Supreme Court of California
 Hugh Murray (rugby union) (1912–2003), Scottish international rugby union player
 Hugh Murray-Aynsley (1828–1917), Member of Parliament in Canterbury, New Zealand
 Hugh Murray (York historian) (1923–2013), a pre-eminent British historian of the city of York
 Muzz Murray (Hugh Washington Murray, 1891–1961), American ice hockey player

See also
 Hugh Murray Shaw (1876–1934), Canadian federal politician